Eiður is an Icelandic given name. It appears in Landnámabók and its meaning is most likely 'oath' in English (ed or eid in some modern Germanic languages). The name is rather uncommon, carried only by around 200 persons.

People with the name Eiður
 Eiður Guðjohnsen, footballer
 Eiður Svanberg Guðnason, politician

References

Masculine given names
Icelandic masculine given names